Mark Upton (born 30 June 1950) is a former English cricketer.  Upton was a right-handed batsman who bowled slow left-arm orthodox.  He was born at Poole, Dorset.

Upton made a single first-class appearance for Sussex against Cambridge University in 1971.  He scored two runs in this match, as well as taking the wicket of Michael Barford, though this came at an overall cost of 120 runs.  Along with fellow debutant Steven Pheasant, this was his only major appearance for Sussex.

References

External links
Mark Upton at ESPNcricinfo
Mark Upton at CricketArchive

1950 births
Living people
Cricketers from Poole
English cricketers
Sussex cricketers